Beate Habetz (born 16 January 1961) is a German former professional racing cyclist. She won the German National Road Race Championship in 1977, 1978, 1979, 1980, 1982 and 1983.

References

External links
 

1961 births
Living people
German female cyclists
People from Pulheim
Sportspeople from Cologne (region)
Cyclists from North Rhine-Westphalia
20th-century German women
21st-century German women